Fei Changfang (fl. 562–598) was a Chinese Buddhist monk, biographer, and bibliographer, from Chengdu. He began as a scholar of the Chinese classics of Confucianism and Daoism, but was converted to Buddhism and became involved in translation work with various Indian monks at the Daxingshan Temple

He is known for his catalogue of Buddhist texts Records of the Three Treasuries Throughout Successive Dynasties (T2034), compiled 597 CE, which was influential in the development of the Chinese Buddhist Tripitaka, however he has come to be known for controversially attributing texts to translators without foundation.

Notes

Bibliography
 Tokuno, Kyoko. 1990. 'The Evaluation of Indigenous Scriptures in Chinese Buddhist Bibliographical Catalogues' in Chinese Buddhist Apocrypha, edited by Robert E Buswell. University of Hawaii Press, 31–74.

Northern Zhou Buddhist monks
Chinese bibliographers
Sui dynasty Buddhist monks
Sui dynasty historians
Writers from Chengdu
Chinese spiritual writers
Historians from Sichuan